Ethiopian Citizens for Social Justice (abbreviated ) is a liberal political party in Ethiopia. It was formed in May 2019 from the merger of the Patriotic Ginbot 7, Ethiopian Democratic Party (EDP), All-Ethiopian Democratic Party (AEDP), Semayawi Party, New Generation Party (NGP), Gambella Regional Movement (GRM), and Unity for Democracy and Justice (UDJ) party. In July 2019, ye-Ethiopia Ra'iy Party (ERaPa) also merged into EZeMa. The party's logo consists of scales of justice with a large pencil acting as a pole connecting the scales.

Its leader is Berhanu Nega, and its deputy leader is Andualem Aragie. Yeshiwas Assefa and Chane Kebede are chairperson and deputy chairperson, respectively.

References

External links
Ethiopian Citizens for Social Justice website

2019 establishments in Ethiopia
Ethiopian nationalism
Liberal parties in Ethiopia
Nationalist parties in Africa
Political parties established in 2019
Political parties in Ethiopia